Anamika (born 17 August 1961) is a contemporary Indian poet, social worker and novelist writing in Hindi, and a critic writing in English. My Typewriter Is My Piano is her collection of poems translated into English. She is known for her feminist poetry.

Early life and education 
Anamika was born on 17 August 1961 in Muzaffarpur, Bihar. Her current topic of research as a fellow at Teen Murti Bhawan, Delhi is "A Comparative Study of Women in Contemporary British and Hindi poetry". She is currently teaching English Literature at a college affiliated to the University of Delhi.

Works

Poetry collection
Tokri mein Digant
Anushtup
Doob-dhaan
Khurdari Hatheliyaan
Paani ko Sab Yaad thaa

Awards 
 2020 - Sahitya Akademi Award for her poetry Tokri Mein Digant 'Their Gatha': 2014 She is the first and only female poet to have won the prize in the award's 65-year history.

References

External links 

 Four poems in Hindi
 Hindi Poems, some with English translations
 Women
 Salt
 Kavitakosh
 Shakhsiyat 

1961 births
Living people
Indian women poets
Poets from Bihar
Indian women novelists
Indian women short story writers
Indian feminists
People from Muzaffarpur
20th-century Indian poets
20th-century Indian women writers
20th-century Indian short story writers
20th-century Indian novelists
Women writers from Bihar
Novelists from Bihar
Recipients of the Sahitya Akademi Award in Hindi
Jibanananda Das Award